Relations between the Georgian and Ukrainian people have grown from the Middle Ages. Since their independence from the Soviet Union, Georgia and Ukraine consider each other strategic partners and have forged close political and cultural relations. The diplomatic relations between the two nations are realized at the level of embassies and consulates. The current Ambassadors Extraordinary and Plenipotentiary are Ukraine's Mykola Spys and Georgia's Grigol Katamadze.

Early contacts
The first significant contact between Georgian and Ukrainian people occurred during the 18th century. Life and creative work of a famous Georgian poet and distinguished officer Davit Guramishvili were closely bound up with Ukraine: in 1760 the poet settled down in Myrhorod, where he lived till the end of his life. Guramishvili's literary work was started in Georgia, but his poetic talent become fully apparent exactly in Ukraine. Autobiographical collected poems Davitiani (1787), the poet's most distinguished work, were created in Ukraine. His other poem "Joyous Spring" was full of sympathy towards peasants and had vivid Ukrainian colouring. The other noted emigrant, Prince Nikolay Tsertelev (Tsereteli, 1790–1869). Although Georgian by origin and Russian by education, he grew up in Ukraine and developed a deep attachments to its people, being one of the earliest enthusiasts of Ukrainian folklore and a staunch local patriot.

The famous Ukrainian poet Lesya Ukrainka settled in Georgia in 1913 with her husband Klyment Kvitka. She died soon afterwards in Tbilisi. The poems of Ukrainka and Taras Shevchenko were translated into Georgian in 1922 (most of the poems of Shevchenko were taught in the Georgian schools before and during the Soviet period). Ukrainians and Georgians soon found themselves in the same political reality. Both countries opposed Russian domination and resisted Russification attempts by the Tsarist and later Soviet Russia.

Post-Revolution and Soviet era
After the Russian Revolution of 1917, both Georgia and Ukraine declared independence as the Democratic Republic of Georgia and the Ukrainian People's Republic respectively. The two republics accorded each other de jure recognition and established diplomatic ties. Victor Tevzaia was Georgia's first ambassador to Ukraine. Both nations were suppressed by the Soviets in 1921 and absorbed into the Soviet Union in 1922. Since 1936, Georgia and Ukraine were officially known as the Georgian Soviet Socialist Republic and the Ukrainian Soviet Socialist Republic.

In 1942, head of OUN Stepan Bandera appealed to the Georgian nation to join his fight against the Soviet authorities and for national liberation. Many Georgians who left their country during the 1921 Red Army invasion of Georgia have settled in Poland. Many of them who had military education crossed into Ukraine and joined the Ukrainian Insurgent Army (Українська Повстанська Армія) against the Soviet regime. In 1943 UPA general Roman Shukhevych created the Georgian battalion of UPA (Грузинська дивізія УПА) which lasted until 1945.

In the last year of the existence of the Soviet Union, Ukraine participated in the union-wide referendum to preserve the Soviet Union in a different form made by Mikhail Gorbachev, while Georgia (aside from Abkhazia) did not. The next month, on April 9, Georgia declared independence from the Soviet Union while Ukraine, the second largest republic behind the Russian SFSR, did so on August 24 after the failed coup in Moscow two days earlier. Eventually, Ukraine held a referendum that took place on December 1 leaves with a 90% favor of independence. The secession ended the chances of the Union staying together, especially on a limited scale. The independence of both countries were recognized by the United States on December 25, 1991.

Post-independence

War in Abkhazia 

In 1992, during the War in Abkhazia, the Ukrainian National Assembly called for volunteers to join their newly created military formation UNSO-Argo with intent to aid Georgian side against the Russian-backed Abkhaz separatists during the conflict. UNSO-Argo (named after Argonauts) with its 150 fighters were deployed to Abkhazia and stationed in Gulripshi, Shroma, Tamishi and Sukhumi. During the full-scale offensive by the Russian and Abkhaz sides in August 1993 on Shroma, Ukrainians managed to repel the attack but lost seven members of their battalion. However, on September 15, 1993, the Ukrainian battalion retreated from Shroma after being outnumbered by the Kuban Cossack formations. Some of the fighters of UNSO-Argo received Georgian medals of Vakhtang Gorgasal's Order, I class.

In January 1996, Ukraine signed a CIS treaty imposing economic sanctions on Abkhazia.

1990s and early-mid 2000s
During the Shevardnadze era, the Georgian government maintained its close relations with Ukraine. However, the relationship has further enhanced after Rose Revolution in Georgia and Orange Revolution in Ukraine. During the Orange Revolution, many Georgians rallied in Kyiv in support of Viktor Yushchenko. Both countries maintain pro-western political orientation and aspire to join NATO and the European Union. The close friendship between Presidents Mikheil Saakashvili and Viktor Yushchenko has also played an important role in recent political unity of the two countries.

War in Eastern Ukraine and Annexation of Crimea 

In 2014, Georgia condemned the Russian annexation of Crimea, voicing support for Ukraine. Georgia imposed a ban on trade and financial transactions with Crimea. This measure mirrored Ukraine's restrictions on such dealings with Georgia's breakaway regions, Abkhazia and South Ossetia, and was meant to signal Georgia's support for the territorial integrity of Ukraine.

Additionally, the Georgian Legion was formed by Georgian volunteers to take part in the War in Donbas on the side of Ukraine. The unit was organized in 2014, and in 2016 it was transferred under the control of the Ukrainian Army, under the 25th Mechanized Infantry Battalion "Kyiv Rus". The group is commanded by Mamuka Mamulashvili, a veteran Georgian officer.

Post–2015 

Former Georgian President Mikheil Saakashvili left Georgia after his second term expired in 2013 and soon moved to Ukraine. The new Georgian government brought criminal charges against him, and he was sentenced in absentia to 6 years in prison by the Tbilisi City Court. Ukraine has rejected Tbilisi's request for the extradition.  In 2015, Ukrainian President Petro Poroshenko appointed Saakashvili as governor of Odessa Oblast, Ukraine's largest province. After his appointment relations between the two countries soured, and for several years Ukraine did not have an Ambassador to Georgia.

Following Saakashvili's resignation from the post of Odessa governor in November 2016, bilateral relations between the two countries began improving. In March 2017, Ukraine, which was at the time a temporary member of the United Nations Security Council, proposed a resolution supporting the territorial integrity of Georgia. However, Russia used its power as a permanent member of the council to veto any further discussion on the matter. Georgia and Ukraine, along with Azerbaijan and Moldova, also vowed to renew their economic ties through GUAM, an economic organization consisting of the four countries.

Georgia and Ukraine have maintained some military ties as well. In 2018, Georgia and Ukraine each participated in Operation Noble Partner 18, and Georgian soldiers and Ukrainian marines conducted urban operations exercises together.

The relations between Ukraine and Georgia has again began to deteriorate in 2020 after Ukrainian President Volodymyr Zelensky appointed Saakashvili as a head of the executive committee of the National Reform Council of Ukraine. In June 2020, Georgia decided to recall its ambassador to Kyiv. In October 2021, when Saakashvili was arrested in Tbilisi upon his return to Georgia, Zelensky announced that he will use "various means" to return Saakashvili back to the country.

The relations between the countries also worsened during the 2022 Russian invasion of Ukraine. On February 1, 2022, the Georgian parliament adopted a supportive resolution for Ukraine amid the Russian military build-up at its border, expressing concerns over the possible military escalation. It reaffirmed its support for the territorial integrity of Ukraine. During the first four months following the outbreak of the war, Georgia has joined more than 260 resolutions and statements condemning Russia's actions. Georgia supported Ukraine diplomatically and politically, although it refused to join economic sanctions imposed on Russia by the Western countries, which left the Ukrainian officials dissatisfied with Georgia's position. Following the demonstrations of solidarity for Ukraine in Tbilisi, the President of Ukraine Volodymyr Zelensky thanked Georgian people for the support and noted that "there are times when citizens are not the Government, but better [than] the Government". Kyiv has subsequently responded by recalling its ambassador from Georgia for consultation. On April 4 Ukraine's intelligence released a statement accusing Georgia of helping Russia to evade Western sanctions, highlighting that "Russian agents are setting up smuggling routes across the Georgia area and Georgia's special services representatives have been instructed by the political leadership not to interfere in the activities of illegal traffickers". Tbilisi has responded by calling accusations "misinformation" and "totally unacceptable", asking Kyiv to either testify or apologize. On April 5, Ukraine's Foreign Minister Dmytro Kuleba stated that Kyiv is still awaiting confirmation from Georgia that it supports Ukraine and not Russia. Georgian authorities in response accused the government of Ukraine of colluding with the Georgian "radical opposition", in reference to the Saakashvili's United National Movement. Vice Prime Minister of Georgia Tea Tsulukiani stated that Ukraine has turned into a "sanctuary for fleeing Georgian criminals" and that she wished that the government of Ukraine would not believe the narratives of the "radical opposition". Nikoloz Samkharadze, Chair of Foreign Relations Committee of Georgian Parliament in interview to Vice stated that "Georgia is the most exposed country in the world to the Russian aggression. The Russian troops are stationed 30 kilometers away from where we are sitting right now, from the heart of the Tbilisi. So, in this circumstances, I think Georgia is punching above its weight when it supports Ukraine at diplomatic forum, politically and also in humanitarian dimension". Both sides noted that the "misunderstandings are largely solved" after the Georgian delegation headed by the Parliament Speaker Shalva Papuashvili visited Ukraine to express their solidarity after the Bucha massacre.

On April 26, 2022 Oleksiy Arestovych, advisor to Zelenskiy, stated that they were trying to involve Georgia and Moldova in the war by making them open "second front" against Russia to relieve Ukraine's situation. The statement caused controversies in Georgia. The Georgian side heavily criticized Arestovych's statement. Georgian Prime Minister Irakli Gharibashvili reassured the public that "Georgia will not get involved in the war" and that "Tbilisi will not turn into a second Mariupol", in reference to the Russian devastation of the Ukrainian city.

On June 26, 2022, Ukrainian President Zelensky has signed a decree dismissing Ukraine's Ambassador to Georgia, Ihor Dolhov.

Cultural relations 
There are many cultural events in both countries, celebrating close relations between Georgian and Ukrainian people. In 2007, Georgians unveiled a statue to Taras Shevchenko in Tbilisi while Ukrainians erected the statue of Georgia's epic poet Shota Rustaveli in Kyiv.

Resident diplomatic missions
 Georgia has an embassy in Kyiv. 
 Ukraine has an embassy in Tbilisi.

See also
Foreign relations of Georgia
Foreign relations of Ukraine 
GUAM Organization for Democracy and Economic Development
Community of Democratic Choice
Black Sea Forum for Partnership and Dialogue
Georgians in Ukraine
Ukrainians in Georgia

References

Ukraine - Georgia Relations
Ukrainian-Georgian relations are model – Victor Yushchenko

 
Ukraine
Bilateral relations of Ukraine